James Putnam may refer to:
 James Putnam (judge) (1725–1789), Attorney General in Massachusetts; judge and politician in New Brunswick
 James Putnam (politician) (1756–1838), politician in Nova Scotia
 James Jackson Putnam (1846–1918), American neurologist
 James O. Putnam (1818–1903), New York politician
 James Putnam (curator), independent curator of art and historical exhibitions
 James E. Putnam (born 1940), American politician in the state of South Dakota
 James D. Putnam (1859–1917), American politician, lawyer, and businessman

See also
 James Putnam Jr. House, Danvers, Massachusetts